Borth Lifeboat Station (based in Borth, Ceredigion, Wales) was first established by the Royal National Lifeboat Institution (RNLI) in June 1966.  The station currently operates a  lifeboat.

The station was opened as a result of a campaign led by Aran Morris MBE who said that his memories of Arctic convoys of World War II inspired him to press for the lifeboat station because it used to take rescuers 20 minutes to get to Borth from Aberystwyth and Aberdyfi during an emergency.

Fleet

See also
 Royal National Lifeboat Institution

References

External links
 Borth Lifeboat Homepage
 RNLI - Borth Lifeboat Station

Lifeboat stations in Wales
Transport infrastructure completed in 1966
Borth